The personal life of Muammar Gaddafi was complicated and the subject of significant international interest.

Personality 
A very private individual, Gaddafi was given to rumination and solitude and could be reclusive. The reporter Mirella Bianco interviewed Gaddafi's father, who stated that his son was "always serious, even taciturn", also being courageous, intelligent, pious, and family-oriented. Gaddafi's friends described him to Bianco as a loyal and generous man. More widely, he was often regarded as being "bizarre, irrational or quixotic". Bearman noted that Gaddafi was emotionally volatile and had an impulsive temperament, with the CIA believing that the Libyan leader suffered from clinical depression.

Health  
He was seen in a wheelchair in 1998, allegedly due to hip surgery, which caused speculations about his health.

Religion 
Gaddafi described himself as a "simple revolutionary" and "pious Muslim" called upon by God to continue Nasser's work. Gaddafi was an austere and devout Muslim, although according to Vandewalle, his interpretation of Islam was "deeply personal and idiosyncratic."

Interests  

He was a football enthusiast and enjoyed both playing the sport and horse riding as a means of recreation. He regarded himself as an intellectual; he was a fan of Beethoven and said his favourite novels were Uncle Tom's Cabin, Roots, and The Stranger.

Appearance 
Gaddafi regarded personal appearance as important, with Blundy and Lycett referring to him as "extraordinarily vain."

Gaddafi had a large wardrobe, and sometimes changed his outfit multiple times a day. He favoured either a military uniform or traditional Libyan dress, tending to eschew Western-style suits. He saw himself as a fashion icon, stating "Whatever I wear becomes a fad. I wear a certain shirt and suddenly everyone is wearing it." Gaddafi's wardrobe was the subject of significant press coverage over the years which was criticized as distracting from serious coverage of Libya.

In 2011 during the revolution Gaddafi invited the New York Times to Tripoli to see his clothing collection.

Residences  
Following his ascension to power, Gaddafi moved into the Bab al-Azizia barracks, a 6-square-kilometre (2.3 sq mi) fortified compound located two miles from the centre of Tripoli. His home and office at Azizia was a bunker designed by West German engineers, while the rest of his family lived in a large two-storey building. Within the compound were also two tennis courts, a football pitch, several gardens, camels and a Bedouin tent in which he entertained guests. In the 1980s, his lifestyle was considered modest in comparison to those of many other Arab leaders.

Security 
He was preoccupied with his own security, regularly changing where he slept and sometimes grounding all other planes in Libya when he was flying. He made particular requests when travelling to foreign countries. During his trips to Rome, Paris, Madrid, Moscow, and New York City, he resided in a bulletproof tent, following his Bedouin traditions. Gaddafi was notably confrontational in his approach to foreign powers and generally shunned Western ambassadors and diplomats, believing them to be spies.

Entourage 
In the 1970s and 1980s, there were reports of his making sexual advances toward female reporters and members of his entourage. Starting in the 1980s, he travelled with his all-female Amazonian Guard, who were allegedly sworn to a life of celibacy. After Gaddafi's death, the Libyan psychologist Seham Sergewa, part of a team investigating sexual offences during the civil war, stated that five of the guards told her they had been raped by Gaddafi and senior officials. After Gaddafi's death, the French journalist Annick Cojean published a book alleging that Gaddafi had had sexual relations with women, some in their early teenage years, who had been specially selected for him. One of those Cojean interviewed, a woman named Soraya, claimed that Gaddafi kept her imprisoned in a basement for six years, where he repeatedly raped her, urinated on her, and forced her to watch pornography, drink alcohol, and snort cocaine. The alleged sexual abuse was said to have been facilitated by Gaddafi's Chief of Protocol Nuri al-Mismari and Mabrouka Sherif. Gaddafi also hired several Ukrainian nurses to care for him; one described him as kind and considerate and was surprised that allegations of abuse had been made against him.

Family 

Gaddafi married his first wife, Fatiha al-Nuri, in 1969. She was the daughter of General Khalid, a senior figure in King Idris's administration, and was from a middle-class background. Although they had one son, Muhammad Gaddafi (born 1970), their relationship was strained, and they divorced in 1970. Gaddafi's second wife was Safia Farkash, née el-Brasai, a former nurse from the Obeidat tribe born in Bayda. They met in 1969, following his ascension to power, when he was hospitalized with appendicitis; he claimed that it was love at first sight. The couple remained married until his death. Together they had seven biological children: Saif al-Islam Gaddafi (born 1972), Al-Saadi Gaddafi (born 1973), Mutassim Gaddafi (1974–2011), Hannibal Muammar Gaddafi (born 1975), Ayesha Gaddafi (born 1976), Saif al-Arab Gaddafi (1982–2011), and Khamis Gaddafi (1983–2011). He also adopted two children, Hana Gaddafi and Milad Gaddafi. Several of his sons gained a reputation for lavish and anti-social behaviour in Libya, which proved a source of resentment toward his administration. His cousin Ahmed Gaddaf al-Dam is Libya's former Special Envoy to Egypt and a leading figure of the Gaddafi regime. He was a key member of Gaddafi's inner circle. His other cousin Mansour Dhao was his chief of security.

References 

Muammar Gaddafi